Pirehlar-e Shah Qasem (also Romanized as Pīrehlar-e Shāh Qāsem) is a village in Abish Ahmad Rural District, Abish Ahmad District, Kaleybar County, East Azerbaijan Province, Iran. At the 2006 census, its population was 202, in 49 families.

References 

Populated places in Kaleybar County